John Hart Terry (November 14, 1924 – October 20, 2001) was an American lawyer and politician from New York.

Life
Terry was born on November 14, 1924, in Syracuse, New York and graduated from Most Holy Rosary in 1941. He graduated from the University of Notre Dame in 1945, and LL.B. from Syracuse University College of Law in 1948. He served in the United States Army from 1943 until 1946 and received a Bronze Star and a Purple Heart for his service during World War II. He married Catherine Jean; and they had three daughters: Lynn, Susan and M. Carole. He also adopted his wife's daughter C. Jean Phelan Terry whose father was killed in World War II.

He was a member of the Board of Supervisors of Onondaga County from 1948 to 1958. He was Assistant Secretary to the Governor of New York from 1959 to 1961. He was a member of the New York State Assembly from 1963 to 1970, sitting in the 174th, 175th, 176th, 177th and 178th New York State Legislatures. He was elected as a Republican to the 92nd United States Congress, holding office from January 3, 1971, to January 3, 1973.

After leaving Congress Terry was Senior Vice President, General Counsel and Secretary of the Niagara Mohawk Power Corporation.  After leaving Niagara Mohawk in 1987 he returned to practicing law in Syracuse. In retirement he resided in Syracuse and Vero Beach, Florida. He died on October 20, 2001; and was buried at Saint Mary's Cemetery in DeWitt, New York.

References

Syracuse Post-Standard, Obituary, John H. Terry, October 22, 2001

1924 births
2001 deaths
Politicians from Syracuse, New York
University of Notre Dame alumni
Syracuse University College of Law alumni
United States Army officers
United States Army personnel of World War II
Republican Party members of the New York State Assembly
County legislators in New York (state)
Republican Party members of the United States House of Representatives from New York (state)
20th-century American politicians
Military personnel from Syracuse, New York
Lawyers from Syracuse, New York
20th-century American lawyers